Patrick John Bradley (born 23 April 1902) was a Scottish professional football player of the 1920s. Born in Coatbridge, his earliest known club was Wolverhampton Wanderers. He made only five appearances for the club in the Football League Second Division before moving to Gillingham of the Third Division South in November 1926. He was a regular in the Gills' first team for the remainder of the 1926–27 season, playing 24 games and scoring three goals, including two in a 4–4 draw with Swindon Town.

The following season, however, he lost his place to new signing Enos Bromage and, despite, returning for a run of nine consecutive first team games in October and November, he never made another Football League appearance for Gillingham and moved on to non-league club Walsall Wood. He later played for another minor club in the same area, Brownhills Albion.

References

1902 births
Year of death missing
Scottish footballers
Gillingham F.C. players
Wolverhampton Wanderers F.C. players
Footballers from Coatbridge
Walsall Wood F.C. players
English Football League players
Association football forwards